Greatest Hits Live is a live album by punk rock band Sham 69. It was recorded live at Clockwise Mobile Studio in Kawasaki, Kanagawa, Japan in March 1991, and released in 2001 on Cherry Red Records.

Track listing

Personnel

Sham 69 
Jimmy Pursey - lead vocals
Dave Parsons - guitar
Ian Whitewood - drums
Andy Prince - bass

Additional personnel 
 Linda Paganelli - saxophone
 Patricia Kuckelmann - keyboards
 Makoto Takahashi - engineer
 Caruzo Fuller - executive producer

References 

Sham 69 live albums
Cherry Red Records live albums
2001 live albums